Suwu Johannes Lontoh (15 June 1908 – 4 January 1945) was a footballer who represented the Dutch East Indies at the 1934 Far Eastern Championship Games.

Personal life and death
Born 15 June 1908 in Manado, Dutch East Indies, Lontoh served in World War II with the Royal Netherlands East Indies Army. He was captured by Japanese forces on 9 March 1942, and died on 4 January 1945.

Career statistics

International

International goals
Scores and results list the Dutch East Indies's goal tally first, score column indicates score after each Dutch East Indies goal.

References

1908 births
1945 deaths
People from Manado
Indonesian footballers
Indonesia international footballers
Association football forwards
Royal Netherlands East Indies Army personnel of World War II
Dutch military personnel killed in World War II
Dutch prisoners of war in World War II
World War II prisoners of war held by Japan
Sportspeople from North Sulawesi